Bjeloševina may refer to:
 Bjeloševina, Nikšić, Montenegro
 Bjeloševina, Pljevlja, Montenegro